Robert "Toto" Grassin (17 September 1898 – 26 June 1980) was a French cyclist who specialized in motor-paced racing. In this discipline he won the national championships in 1924 and the UCI Motor-paced World Championships in 1925.

References

1898 births
1980 deaths
French male cyclists
Sportspeople from Le Mans
UCI Track Cycling World Champions (men)
French track cyclists
Cyclists from Pays de la Loire
21st-century French people